Line 4 is an underground rapid transit line in Milan, Italy, part of the Milan Metro. The line color is blue. The first section opened on 26 November 2022 and the rest of the line expected to open by 2023.

The line features automatic driverless trains and is designed for a capacity of 24–28,000 passengers per hour in each direction.
The expected annual ridership is 87 million.

Construction
The line was originally planned to be completed in 2015, as part of the works for the Milan Expo. However, delays in planning, financing and construction works forced to postpone the opening, with the first section opening on 26 November 2022 and the rest of the line expected to open by 2023.
By June 2023, 2 more will open, and by October 2024, 11 more stops will open. 

The consortium ATM-Webuild is responsible for the construction works.

Of the total estimated cost of about €1.7 billion, the Government of Italy will cover €786 million via a grant, the municipal government of Milan will cover €400 million, and €512 million will be funded by private investors.

Route

The line is planned to connect the south-western neighborhood of Lorenteggio with Linate Airport on the east, passing through the city center. All stations are underground.

Rolling stock
The line uses Hitachi Rail Italy Driverless Metro automatic driverless trains.
The line will be operated by 37 four-car EMUs manufactured by Hitachi Rail Italy at Reggio Calabria. Because of production problem caused by the COVID-19 pandemic, some were sent to Hitachi Newton Aycliffe in England for final fitting out.

See also

Transport in Milan
Milan S Lines

References

4
Railway lines opened in 2022